North Pacific Yachts is a privately held company based in Surrey, British Columbia which builds  recreational trawler yachts. The company manufactures ships near Shanghai, China.

Company 

North Pacific Yachts Inc. was founded in 2004 and as of Dec 2020, has built and delivered 138 boats to the US, Canada, Europe and Japan. The company is focused on building long range cruisers that facilitate extended cruising and on-board living. North Pacific Yachts currently offers five models from 44' to 59'. 

Current Models: 

North Pacific 44' Sedan  

North Pacific 45' Pilothouse 

North Pacific 49' Pilothouse (also offered with an extended cockpit) 

North Pacific 49' Euro Pilothouse (also offered with an extended cockpit) 

North Pacific 59' Pilothouse 

North Pacific Yachts also offers a brokerage service for pre-owned NPs as well as other vessels.

Notes

External links 
 North Pacific Yachts website
North Pacific Owners Forum website

Shipbuilding companies of the United States
Privately held companies of Canada